Grand Ayatollah Mohammad Ebrahim Jannaati (born 1933 in Shahrood, Iran) is an Iranian Twelver Shia Marja. He has studied in seminaries of Qom and Najaf under Grand Ayatollahs Borujerdi and Khomeini. He is known for his progressive fatwas on women and youth issues, such as:

Teachers and Mentors 
Jannaati learned from and studied under Seyyed Hossein Borujerdi, Ruhollah Khomeini, Seyed Mahmoud Hoseyni Shahroudi, Seyed Mohsen Hakim, Syed Abdul Hadi Shirazi, Hussein helli, Mirza Baqir Zanjani, and Abu al-Qasim al-Khoei.

Rare Islamic law and modern 
Rare rulings:"
 If the loss of a Muslim man with a non-Muslim woman is essential and leave it caused Muslim outrage and insult to Islam or may not pessimism, there is no problem.
 Muslim man marrying a girl or woman from books such as Zoroastrian, Jewish and Christian is permitted, either on a temporary or permanent basis.
 Relations between girls and boys, women and men, strangers in the community, if not corruption and to preserve Islamic law and to the extent that is necessary, not a hindrance.
 It is necessary for women to cover their whole bodies from strangers except for the face and hands. No special kind and color of dress is recommended; anything with which the body can be covered would be sufficient.

See also
List of marjas

References

External links 
 

Iranian ayatollahs
People from Shahrud, Iran
1933 births
Living people